Luigi Lodde (born 19 April 1980) is an Italian sport shooter. At the 2012 Summer Olympics he competed in the Men's skeet, finishing in 5th place.

See also
 Skeet World Record holder

References

External links
 

1980 births
Living people
Italian male sport shooters
Olympic shooters of Italy
Shooters at the 2012 Summer Olympics
Shooters at the 2016 Summer Olympics
Shooters of Gruppo Sportivo Esercito
Competitors at the 2013 Mediterranean Games
Mediterranean Games competitors for Italy
20th-century Italian people
21st-century Italian people